Najiba Gashim qizi Melikova (1921–1992) also Näcibä Mälikova, was an Azerbaijani and Soviet actress of theater and film. She was awarded the title of People's Artists of the Azerbaijan SSR (June 1, 1974).

Biography 
Melikova was born on October 25, 1921 in the Buzovna settlement of Baku, Azerbaijan Democratic Republic. She received her primary education in a village. From 1940 to 1943, she studied at the Baku Theater School, where she was in the same class as Fatma Kadri. After graduating from school, she started work at Ganja State Drama Theater. Soon after returning to Baku, she entered the Theater Institute, graduating in 1951. 

Melikova started stage acting in 1938. In 1952, she began to appear in episodic roles in the National Drama Theater. Melikova appeared in dramas and comedies. 

On June 10, 1959, Melikova received the title of Honored Artist of the Azerbaijan SSR. On June 1, 1974, she was award the title, People's Artists of the Azerbaijan SSR. 

The actress died on July 27, 1992 in Baku. She was buried in the Alley of Honor cemetery in Baku.

Theatrical works 
Melikova played roles in the following theatrical plays:
 Shoyli khanum - "Vizier of the Lankaran Khanate" (M.F Akhundov)
 Humar - "Sheikh Sanan" (G. Javid)
 Khuraman - "Vagif" (S. Vurgun)
 Sadgiya Hatun - "The Sword and the Feather" (M.S Ordubadi)
 Humar - "Sheikh Sanan" (Huseyn Javid)
 Firangiz - "Siyavush" (Abdulragim bey Hagverdiyev)
 Boyukhan - "Aydin" (Jafar Jabbarli)
 Sona - "in 1905" (Jafar Jabbarli)
 Edel - "Sevil" (Jafar Jabbarli)
 Atlas - "Life" (Mirza Ibragimov)
 Firuza - "Winds" (Sabit Rahman)
 Sofia Ivanovna - "Zikov's" (Maxim Gorky)
 Ogudalova - "A Girl Without a Dowry" (Alexander Ostrovsky)
 Malakhat - "Strange guy" (Ilyas Efendiyev)

Filmography 
Melikova performed lyrical-dramatic, emotional, benevolent roles.
 1945 -The Cloth Peddler, Jagan-Hala (directed by Tofig Taghizade)
 1947 - Fatali Khan - Khadija
 1950 - Fires of Baku - Mirvarid (duplicated by N. Cherednichenko)
 1958 - The Stepmother, Dilara
 1960 - Aygun
 1961 - Legend and love - Salima (duplicated by M. Blinov)
 1963 - Where is Ahmed? - Nargiz
 1968 - In the name of the law - Zarintaj (dubbed Tamara Semina)
 1981 - Long Life Chords

References

External links 

http://www.anl.az/down/he_serencamlar.pdf
http://kulis.lent.az/news/1975
http://www.apasport.az/news/99325
https://www.youtube.com/watch?v=WRx8gxT8G0Y
https://www.youtube.com/watch?v=eDCcCB2CxkA

1921 births
1992 deaths
Azerbaijani actresses
Actors from Baku
Soviet actresses
Burials at II Alley of Honor
People's Artists of the Azerbaijan SSR